The Bangladesh National Women's Cricket team toured Ireland in September 2016 for a series of two One day internationals (ODI) and two T20Is (T20I) against the Irish side. All the matches were held in Bready Cricket Club in Tyrone.

The T20Is were held on 5 and 6 September respectively, followed by the ODIs on 8 and 10 September. Bangladesh side were without their captain Salma Khatun. A third ODI was added to the series, after the first match was washed out.

Squads

T20I series

1st T20I

2nd T20I

ODI Series

1st ODI

2nd ODI

3rd ODI

References

External links
Series home at ESPN Cricinfo

2016 in women's cricket
Ireland 2016
Bangladesh 2016
International cricket competitions in 2016
2016 in Bangladeshi cricket
2016 in Irish cricket
Bangladeshi cricket tours of Ireland
Cricket